Wolfram Aïchele (29 April 1924 – 9 June 2016) was an artist from Baden-Württemberg in Southern Germany.

His work has been exhibited in America, Germany, France, Belgium, Switzerland, the Netherlands and Luxembourg.

His paintings have been acquired by the French state, the City of Paris, The Museum of the History and Art of Luxemburg, the State of Baden-Württemberg, the Federal Bank of Germany and Daimler-Benz, as well as many private collectors.

Son of the distinguished animal artist, Erwin Aichele, Aïchele's Third Reich childhood is the subject of a 2011 book by the author and historian Giles Milton (who is also his son-in-law) called Wolfram: The Boy Who Went To War.

Aïchele's work has been the subject of a number of critical studies, notably Franz Elgar's Wolfram.

He is listed in Gérard Xuriguéra's "Le dessin, le pastel, l’aquarelle dans l’Art Contemporain"

Early years 
Aïchele's childhood was spent in the artists' colony of Eutingen, near Pforzheim in Baden-Württemberg. His father, Erwin Aichele, worked from a studio in the grounds of the house.

Aïchele developed an interest in folk art at an early age. He had a particular passion for the medieval Gothic art of southern Germany. Lucas Moser's altarpiece in Tiefenbron, the sculptures of Tilman Riemenschneider and the fortress architecture of Bad Wimpfen and other Swabian towns and villages all influenced his early artwork.

At the age of 17, Aïchele decided to train as a sculptor and was accepted on a four-year woodcarving course at the Bavarian State Woodcarving School in Oberammergau.

War years 
In 1942, Aïchele's studies were interrupted by the Second World War. He was conscripted into the German army and sent to the Crimea. Severe illness saw him transferred to a military hospital in Marienbad.

Once recuperated, he was sent to Normandy where he served as a communications officer in the German 77th Infantry Division.

He surrendered to American forces at the end of July, 1944 and spent the next two years as a prisoner of war, first in England and then in America.

Studies and influences 

Aïchele returned to Oberammergau in 1946 and completed his sculpting course with distinction. One of his finest works, a processional church staff, is on display in the church of St Peter and St Paul in Oberammergau.

The Bavarian State Woodcarving School was open in spirit: Aïchele discovered modern artists whose work had been banned under the Third Reich, notably Emil Nolde, Paul Klee and other artists of Der Blaue Reiter (The Blue Rider).

Aïchele continued his studies at the Academy of Fine Art in Stuttgart, where his tutor was the sculptor Otto Baum. He became particularly interested in religious – and especially Byzantine – art.

In 1954, Aïchele embarked on an artistic pilgrimage to Serbia, Kosovo, Macedonia and Mount Athos. He drew particular inspiration from the medieval monasteries of Kosovo, particularly Gračanica Monastery, Studenica Monastery and Sopoćani Monastery, as well as the Byzantine treasures of Mount Athos.

On returning to Germany, he became increasingly interested in iconography. He painted icons using the traditional technique of egg tempera.

His aim was to return to the pure iconographical style represented by medieval masters such as Andrei Rublev – a style that had been corrupted in the 19th century.

Among his works from this period is the iconostasis of the Russian Orthodox Church of St Mary Pokrov in Düsseldorf.

The Paris years 
Aïchele moved to Paris in 1956. He continued to paint icons but was increasingly drawing inspiration from elsewhere – Eastern European folk art, Persian miniatures and such modern artists as Paul Klee, Wassily Kandinsky and, above all, Marc Chagall and the masters of Cubism.

In the 1970s, Aïchele began to be represented by the celebrated Parisian gallery owner Jean-Louis Roque and his work became known to a wider public.

He was no longer painting icons: his preferred medium was now watercolour, through which he created his own highly idiosyncratic style.

The influence of folk art and iconographical techniques can be seen in many works from this period. Aïchele also drew inspiration from his visits to the Alps: the forms of these mountain ranges are often visible in his paintings.

In the late 1970s, Wolfram's work metamorphosed into a unique blend of figurative art and abstract art. The figurate elements provide the key to unlocking the abstract, whereby the tensions in the composition suddenly reveal a landscape with its horizons and points of light.

Alongside his watercolours, Aïchele has also created different types of collage from paper that he has painted and then torn. These collages have a tactile quality that is enhanced by the intensity of the colour.

Later works 
In his later years, Aïchele worked in a smaller format, displaying particular interest in the interaction between figurative and abstract and shape and form, working with multiple horizons and shafts of light.

He is represented by Galerie Capazza in Nancay, France.

A 2009 exhibition in Aïchele's native Baden brought together works by eight artist members of the family.

Family life 
Aïchele married Barbara Rodi in 1964. They have two children, the jeweller Benedikt Aichele, and the artist and illustrator, Alexandra Milton. Aïchele lived in Paris.

See also
 List of German painters

References

External links 
 The official website of Aïchele
 The website of Gallery Cappaza

20th-century German painters
20th-century German male artists
German male painters
21st-century German painters
21st-century German male artists
2016 deaths
1924 births
German Army officers of World War II
German prisoners of war in World War II held by the United Kingdom
German prisoners of war in World War II held by the United States
People associated with Mount Athos